Knowledge Fight is a podcast dedicated to analyzing and critiquing episodes of Alex Jones' Infowars shows. The podcast was created in January 2017. It is hosted by the former stand-up comedians Dan Friesen and Jordan Holmes, both of whom live in Chicago, Illinois. As of March 13th, 2023, a total of 785 episodes of the podcast have been released. In each episode, Friesen plays clips of noteworthy moments from one of Jones' shows, which are followed by Holmes' reactions.

Along with Jones, Friesen and Holmes occasionally cover other conspiricy figures they consider to be relevant to their main subject on their 'Wacky Wednesday' episodes. 1990s radio conspiricy theorist Bill Cooper and current new-age alien conspiricist 'sweary' Kerry Cassidy are recurrent subjects.

The podcast series has been used by lawyers researching Alex Jones in relation to his various Sandy Hook lawsuits. Friesen has been called upon as an expert in Alex Jones and his shows by plaintiffs lead council in Texas Mark Bankston because of the podcast series. Bankston has appeared as a guest on Knowledge Fight multiple times.

References

External links

2017 podcast debuts
Comedy and humor podcasts
Political podcasts
Works about conspiracy theories